Many universities offer programs of study which tag academic degrees with a particular speciality. A tagged degree incorporates the name of the subject of study into the degree title and generally requires more specialized coursework than a degree with an untagged major.

Tagged degrees come in two varieties:

 the first form is a more general bachelor's or master's degree with a specialty tag appended to the title (e.g., Bachelor of Science in Nursing);
 the second form is even more specialized (e.g., Master of Business Administration, Doctor of Medicine, etc.) and is generally associated with a professional education curriculum.

Bachelor degrees
Bachelor of Accountancy (BAcc)
Bachelor of Architecture (BArch)
 Bachelor of Business Administration (BBA)
 Bachelor of Commerce (BComm)
 Bachelor of Civil Law (BCL)
 Bachelor of Divinity (BDiv)
 Bachelor of Economics (BEc)
 Bachelor of Education (BEd)
 Bachelor of Engineering (BEng)
 Bachelor of Fine Arts (BFA)
 Bachelor of Laws (LLB)
 Bachelor of Letters (BLitt)
Bachelor of Music (BM)
 Bachelor of Pharmacy (BPharm)
 Bachelor of Philosophy (BPhil)
 Bachelor of Science in Nursing (BSN)
 Bachelor of Social Work (BSW)
 Bachelor of Technology (BTech)
 Bachelor of Theology (BTh)
 Bachelor of Medicine, Bachelor of Surgery (MBBS)

Master degrees 

 Bachelor of Civil Law (BCL)
 Licentiate in Sacred Theology (STL)
 Magister Juris (MJur)
 Master of Business Administration (MBA)
 Master of Counselling (MCouns)
 Master of Divinity (MDiv)
 Master of Education (MEd)
 Master of Engineering (MEng)
 Master of Fine Arts (MFA)
 Master of Laws (LLM)
 Master of Letters (MLitt)
 Master of Medicine (MMed)
 Master of Philosophy (MPhil)
 Master of Public Administration (MPA)
 Master of Public Health (MPH)
 Master of Research (MRes)
 Master of Sacred Theology (STM)
 Master of Science in Nursing (MSN)
 Master of Social Work (MSW)
 Master of Studies (MSt)
 Master of Surgery (ChM or MS)
 Professional Science Masters (PSM)

Doctoral degrees
 Doctor of Arts (DA)
 Doctor of Audiology (AuD)
 Doctor of Business Administration (DBA)
 Doctor of Canon Law (JCD)
 Doctor of Civil Law (DCL)
 Doctor of Clinical Psychology (DClinPsy)
 Doctor of Chiropractic (DC)
 Doctor of Dental Surgery (DDS)
 Doctor of Divinity (DDiv)
 Doctor of Education (EdD)
 Doctor of Juridical Science (JSD)
 Doctor of Letters (DLitt)
 Doctor of Medicine (MD)
 Doctor of Ministry (DMin)
 Doctor of Naturopathic Medicine (ND)
 Doctor of Osteopathic Medicine (DO)
 Doctor of Pharmacy (DPharm)
 Doctor of Philosophy (PhD)
Doctor of Psychology (PsyD)
 Doctor of Science (DSc or ScD)
 Doctor of Theology (ThD)
 Doctor of Veterinary Medicine (DVM)
 Juris Doctor (JD)

Higher education-related lists
Academic degrees